Sacred Sites and Pilgrimage Routes in the Kii Mountain Range is a UNESCO World Heritage Site located on the Kii Peninsula in Japan.

Selection criteria 

The locations and paths for this heritage site were based on their historical and modern importance in religious pilgrimages.  It was also noted for its fusion of Shinto and Buddhist beliefs, and a well documented history of traditions over 1,200 years.  The nature scenery on the Kii peninsula was also taken into consideration, with its many streams, rivers and waterfalls.  Technically, independent structures at nominated temples and shrines were nominated for this distinction, and not the entire establishments.  Sections of the trails were included for this nomination, but not the full length of their expanses.  A total of 242 elements were selected from sites and pilgrimage routes for nomination.

List of sites

See also 

Tourism in Japan
 List of World Heritage Sites in Japan

References 
 ICOMOS (2004). Advisory Body Evaluation. Retrieved on 2009-07-27. 
 Agency for Cultural Affairs (2003). Sacred Sites and Pilgrimage Routes in the Kii Mountain Range, and the Cultural Landscapes that Surround Them. Retrieved on 2014-05-04.
 Sacred Sites and Pilgrimage Routes in The Kii Mountain Range - UNESCO website (2004)  Retrieved on 2018-11-4.

Religious places
Shinto
World Heritage Sites in Japan
Tourist attractions in Nara Prefecture
Tourist attractions in Mie Prefecture
Tourist attractions in Wakayama Prefecture
Japanese pilgrimages
Kumano faith